The Local Audit and Accountability Act  2014 is a United Kingdom act of parliament. Its main provisions:

abolish the Audit Commission and repeal the Audit Commission Act 1998 (section 1)
establish new arrangements for the audit and accountability of local public bodies
ensure increases set by levying bodies are taken into account when local authorities determine whether they have set an excessive amount of council tax 
ensure local authorities comply with the Code of Recommended Practice on Local Authority Publicity (section 39)
allow local residents to film, tweet and blog council meetings
allow the Secretary of State for Communities and Local Government to alter the number of electors needed to trigger a parish poll

References 

Local government legislation in England and Wales
United Kingdom Acts of Parliament 2014
Acts of the Parliament of the United Kingdom concerning England
2014 in England
Audit legislation
Auditing in the United Kingdom